37th NSFC Awards
January 4, 2003

Best Film: 
 The Pianist 

The 37th National Society of Film Critics Awards, given on 4 January 2003, honored the best in film for 2002.

Winners

Best Picture 
1. The Pianist
2. Y Tu Mamá También
3. Talk to Her (Hable con ella)

Best Director 
1. Roman Polanski – The Pianist
2. Pedro Almodóvar – Talk to Her (Hable con ella)
3. Alfonso Cuarón – Y Tu Mamá También

Best Actor 
1. Adrien Brody – The Pianist
2. Michael Caine – The Quiet American
3. Aurélien Recoing – Time Out (L'emploi du temps)

Best Actress 
1. Diane Lane – Unfaithful
2. Maggie Gyllenhaal – Secretary
2. Isabelle Huppert – The Piano Teacher (La pianiste)

Best Supporting Actor 
1. Christopher Walken – Catch Me If You Can
2. Chris Cooper – Adaptation.
3. Alan Arkin – Thirteen Conversations About One Thing

Best Supporting Actress 
1. Patricia Clarkson – Far from Heaven
2. Fiona Shaw – The Triumph of Love
3. Kathy Bates – About Schmidt

Best Screenplay 
1. Ronald Harwood – The Pianist
2. Alexander Payne and Jim Taylor – About Schmidt
3. Carlos Cuarón and Alfonso Cuarón – Y Tu Mamá También

Best Cinematography 
1. Edward Lachman – Far from Heaven
2. Paweł Edelman – The Pianist
3. Robert Elswit – Punch-Drunk Love

Best Foreign Language Film 
1. Y Tu Mamá También
2. Talk to Her (Hable con ella)
3. Time Out (L'emploi du temps)

Best Non-Fiction Film 
1. Standing in the Shadows of Motown
2. The Cockettes
3. Domestic Violence 
3. The Kid Stays in the Picture

Film Heritage Award 
 Kino International for releasing restored versions of Fritz Lang's Metropolis and D. W. Griffith silent films

Special Citation 
 UCLA's film and television archives

References

External links
 Past Awards

2002 film awards
2002
2003 in American cinema